Alzate is a surname. Notable people with the surname include:

Aníbal Alzate (1933–2016), Colombian footballer
Carlos Alzate (born 1983), Colombian track and road racing cyclist
José Luis Serna Alzate (1936–2014), Colombian Roman Catholic bishop
Steven Alzate (born 1998), English footballer